Nezu Station (根津駅 Nezu-eki) is a metro station on the Tokyo Metro Chiyoda Line located in Bunkyo, Tokyo.

Station layout
The station is reached by stairways from the street to the ticket wickets.
The station consists of two side platforms located on separate levels.

Platforms

History 
Nezu Station opened for revenue service on 20 December 1969.

The station facilities were inherited by Tokyo Metro after the privatization of the Teito Rapid Transit Authority (TRTA) in 2004.

Surrounding area
 Nezu Shrine
 Yanaka shopping area and Yanaka Cemetery
 Shinobazu Pond and Ueno Park
 University of Tokyo
 Sawanoya Ryokan

References

External links
 Tokyo Metro Nezu Station

Railway stations in Japan opened in 1969
Railway stations in Tokyo
Tokyo Metro Chiyoda Line